Nils Petter Gleditsch (born 17 July 1942 in Sutton, Surrey, Great Britain) is a Norwegian sociologist and political scientist. He is Research Professor at the Peace Research Institute Oslo (PRIO). In 2009, Nils Petter Gleditsch was awarded the annual Award for Outstanding Research by the Research Council of Norway. He won the Norwegian Sociological Association's Lifetime Achievement Award in 2018.

In 1982 he was convicted in Norway of a violation of the national security paragraphs of the penal code, in the Wilkes/Gleditsch trial. His prison sentence was suspended.

Biography
Nils Petter Gleditsch is the son of Kristian Gleditsch and Nini Haslund Gleditsch, the nephew of Ellen Gleditsch, and the father of Kristian Skrede Gleditsch.

Following studies in philosophy and economy Gleditsch became mag.art. (PhD equivalent) in sociology at the University of Oslo. In 1966-67 he read sociology, social psychology and international relations at the University of Michigan in United States. He graduated from University of Oslo in 1968 with a master's degree.

Since 1964, Gleditsch has been at the Peace Research Institute Oslo (PRIO), first as a student, later as researcher and research leader. He was Director of PRIO in 1972 and 1977–78. From 2002-2008 he led the working group 'Environmental Factors of Civil War' at PRIO's Centre for the Study of Civil War, appointed Centre of Excellence by the Research Council of Norway. Since 1993 he has also been Professor at NTNU. Gleditsch was editor of Journal of Peace Research 1983–2010, succeeded by Henrik Urdal. Gleditsch served as president for the International Studies Association (ISA) 2008–09.

He is a member of the Norwegian Academy of Science and Letters.

References

External links
 Staff page at PRIO

Living people
1942 births
Peace and conflict scholars
Norwegian sociologists
Norwegian political scientists
Members of the Norwegian Academy of Science and Letters
Criminals from Oslo
Academic staff of the Norwegian University of Science and Technology
University of Oslo alumni
University of Michigan alumni